Autolinee Regionali Luganesi (ARL) is a public transport operator in the region around the Swiss city of Lugano. It operates bus services from Lugano to various outer-suburban communities. There is some overlap in terms of places served with the Trasporti Pubblici Luganesi (TPL), the Lugano city bus operator, and Autopostale, the regional post bus operator.

The company was formed by the merger of the bus services of the Lugano–Tesserete railway and Lugano–Cadro–Dino railway.

Today the company operates three routes (frequency may be reduced on weekends and evenings):

References

External links 
 
 

Bus companies of Switzerland
Transport in Lugano